A Cyclic pump is an apparatus which moves a fluid in a periodic uni-directional direction from one containment system to another while overcoming static conditions that would, without intervention, not move.  The intervention predicated by the pump alters pressures, volumes and sometimes temperatures of fluids (gaseous, liquid, colloidal, plasmic, etc.) in such a way that the fluids are transported to other chambers or enclosures (including pipes), thus "flowing" in a consistent direction, usually having characteristics of pulsation (as is the case with the Human heart) or of uniform motion (as is the case with an Automobile motor oil pump).  Cyclic pumps are generally incorporated into machines to deal with all sorts of fluids associated with that machine's functionality.

References

See also

 Water hammer
 Hydraulic ram
 Fluid dynamics
 Switched-mode power supply
 Boost converter
 Buck converter
 Buck–boost converter

Pumps
Articles containing video clips